Eddie Andelman (born 1937 Stoda, Greg, "Boston’s Eddie Andelman, godfather of sports talk, still feisty at 77", The Palm Beach Post, July 7, 2014) is an American sports radio talk show host. He has worked over 40 years in sports talk radio in Boston and has appeared on over 100 sports stations all over the country.

Early life and education 
Eddie was born in the Boston neighborhood of Dorchester, Massachusetts and raised in Brookline, Massachusetts.Dupont, Kevin Paul, "Eddie Andelman to be honored at ‘Tradition’", The Boston Globe, September 7, 2014 He graduated from Boston University and earned an MBA from Northeastern University. Before he first got into radio on WBZ in 1969 (see above), he ran his family's real estate development business.

Career 
Andelman's career in sports talk radio began in June 1969, on a suburban station called WUNR.  His show, "Sports Huddle," then moved to Boston's WBZ later that year. Airing on Sunday 7-10 PM weekly, "Sports Huddle," also featured Jim McCarthy and Mark Witkin. Andelman remained at WBZ until mid-1971, when he and the show moved to WEEI. He began a television program for WNAC (now WHDH), Channel 7, in November 1972, which lasted until early 1976. He has also been a host on WCVB Channel 5, and in addition to his early work at WBZ and WEEI, has hosted talk radio shows on WUNR, WHDH, and WWZN.

After WEEI, his Sports Huddle moved to WTKK and lasted for many years until December 26, 2010.

Personal life 
His son David created The Phantom Gourmet television show. His other sons, including Dan Andelman, host the show.

Eddie and his wife Judith live in West Palm Beach, Florida.

Charitable work

Hot Dog Safari 
Andelman is involved with many charitable organizations, but is best known in the New England area for his Hot Dog Safari, which he has hosted since 1990, raises money for the Joey Fund / Cystic Fibrosis (CF) Foundation. The event started when during one of his Sports Huddle shows he called the hot dog the ultimate sports food. He and his callers then debated over who made the best ones.  After some time, he decided to resolve the issue by organizing a bus trip for 200 individuals to various hot dog stands. As Eddie told his listeners, "We are on a hot dog safari." The money from ticket sales went to benefit the Joey Fund. Since then the event has grown, and now includes local celebrities, members of the media and professional athletes, and over the years has raised over a million dollars for the Joey Fund / Cystic Fibrosis Foundation.

Other charitable works 

 Creator of the New York/Boston Unity Fund, which raised over $135,000 after the terrorist attack on September 11, 2001 and was named Honorary Fire Chief upon his visit to Ground Zero.
 Raised $50,000 to enable paralyzed jockey Rudy Biaz to build ramps in his house.
 Delivered baseball equipment to youth in the Dominican Republic.
 He and his wife Judith (whom he often called "the fabulous Judy" on his Sports Huddle talk show) were made honorary Goodwill Ambassadors by the Aruba Tourism Authority in honor of their having visited the island 53 times over 35 years.

Recognition for works 
 Jimmy Fund Man of the Year
 Joey Fund-Cystic Fibrosis man of the Year
 Big Brother Man of the Year.

WEEI 
Andelman worked at WEEI for ten years until his abrupt departure in December 2001.  Reports described him as unhappy with the direction the station had taken toward more confrontational shows like ‘The Dennis and Callahan Show’ and ‘The Big Show’.  He was also said to be unhappy when the station paired him up with co-host Dale Arnold as the ‘A-Team’.  Although Arnold denied any personal problems between them, the two reportedly didn't get along either on or off the air. WEEI replaced Andelman with former television sportscaster Bob Neumeier.

Andelman comments about WEEI since leaving the station 
Regarding the current state of sports radio, including WEEI, Andelman observed,

“I’ve been planning this show at WTKK for almost two years. Radio should be a theater of the mind, not screaming and stupidity.

“WEEI has too many people who are not trained and not educated. They pay players and coaches to be on their shows. Then they have to watch what questions they ask. I won't pay guests. Sports radio has become public relations. Everyone kisses ass.” 

He pledged to start a movement called Fans against Idiot Radio (FAIR) as an antidote to "venomous" WEEI.

WWZN (WMEX) 
In early 2002 Andelman joined WWZN, a direct competitor to WEEI in Boston,  which hired him as part of its strategy to challenge WEEI as Boston's sports talk leader, along with former Red Sox play-by-play announcer Sean McDonough and Ryen Russillo.  The station additionally paid for the rights to broadcast Boston Celtics basketball games for five years.  In the end, however, WWZN couldn't compete with WEEI, sold its Celtics rights to WRKO and replaced all local broadcasts in October 2005 with a nationally syndicated lineup.

References

External links 
 Eddie Andelman's Hot Dog Safari Web Site
 
 WEEI Web Site

Radio personalities from Boston
Boston University alumni
American radio personalities
Boston sportscasters
Living people
American sports announcers
Boxing commentators
American horse racing announcers
Northeastern University alumni
1937 births